Lee Colin Clarke (born 28 July 1983) is a professional footballer who plays for St Neots Town. Born in England, he represented Northern Ireland internationally at youth levels U21 and U23. He is the son of former Northern Ireland international Colin Clarke.

Career
Clarke started his career at Yaxley, then moved to Peterborough United where he made several appearances. He then moved to St Albans City, where he was the top scorer for two seasons in the Conference South and was vital in their promotion to the Conference National in 2006.

He has won five caps for the Northern Ireland U21s.

On 2 April 2009, Clarke had his contract cancelled by mutual consent because of his nagging knee injury that prevented him from playing for most of the season.

In May 2009, he signed for Welling United. He was voted supporters' player of the season at the end of the 2010–11 campaign, and captained Welling to the Conference South title in 2012–13.

In May 2014 it was announced that Clarke had resigned for St Albans City.

In February 2015 Clarke signed for St Neots Town, scoring on his debut.

References

External links
Lee Clarke profile at sacfc.co.uk

NIFG profile

1983 births
Living people
Sportspeople from Peterborough
English footballers
Association football forwards
Yaxley F.C. players
Peterborough United F.C. players
Kettering Town F.C. players
St Albans City F.C. players
Welling United F.C. players
English Football League players
National League (English football) players
Northern Ireland under-21 international footballers